Lovedolls Superstar may refer to:

Lovedolls Superstar (film), a 1986 film
Lovedolls Superstar (soundtrack), its soundtrack